Vellayani Arjunan (born 10 February 1933) is an Indian writer, scholar and linguist from Kerala. He has served two terms at the State Institute of Encyclopaedic Publications, a state government agency, as the Chief Editor from 1975 to 1988 and as the director from 2001 to 2004. During his tenure at the institute, seven volumes of the 12 volume Malayalam encyclopedia, Viswasahityavijnanakosam were published. He is credited with several publications including children's literature and critical studies. His book, Gaveshana Mekhala has been a prescribed text for the post graduate course, M.A. Malayalam, at the Aligarh Muslim University. A recipient of the Paramacharya Award from Sarojini Bhaskaran Memorial Charitable Public Trust, he was honored by the Government of India, in 2008, with the fourth highest Indian civilian award of Padma Shri.

In 2015, Aligarh Muslim University awarded him a third D.Litt. degree for his thesis in Malayalam on Influence of Sree Narayana Guru on Malayalam Poetry. He is the first Indian to hold three D.Litt. degrees.

Early life and education
Vellayani Arjunan was born on 10 February 1933 to G. Shankara Panicker, an agriculturalist and Narayani, a housewife, at Vellayani in the erstwhile Kingdom of Travancore. After procuring a Master of Arts degree in Malayalam, he went on to teach Malayalam Language and Literature at Sree Narayana College, Kollam. He later became the first Malayalam lecturer in Aligarh Muslim University, from where he gained his PhD degree in 1964. After leaving Aligarh Muslim University, he was appointed as the Director of the State Institute of Encyclopaedic Publications in Kerala.

Other Degrees

See also

 State Institute of Encyclopaedic Publications
 Viswasahityavijnanakosam

References

Further reading

External links
 

1933 births
Living people
Recipients of the Padma Shri in literature & education
People from Thiruvananthapuram district
Scholars from Kerala
20th-century Indian linguists
Malayalam-language writers